Arquímides Rafael "Quimi" Zacarías Ordóñez (born August 5, 2003) is a professional footballer who plays as a forward for Major League Soccer club FC Cincinnati. Born in the United States, he represents the Guatemala national team.

Club career
Born in Cincinnati, Ohio, Ordonez began his career with youth soccer clubs Kings Hammer Academy and Cincinnati United Premier. In 2016, he joined the youth academy at Major League Soccer club Columbus Crew. He stayed with the club until 2019 when he joined the youth squad at FC Cincinnati for their inaugural season as a program.

On July 3, 2021, due to performances with the youth squad, Ordonez signed a professional homegrown player deal with FC Cincinnati on a three-year deal. He made his competitive debut for the club on July 24, coming on as a substitute in a 3–0 away defeat against Nashville SC.

Career statistics

Club

Honours
Individual
CONCACAF U-20 Championship Best XI: 2022

References

External links
 Profile at FC Cincinnati

2003 births
Living people
Soccer players from Cincinnati
People from Fort Thomas, Kentucky
Guatemalan footballers
Guatemala under-20 international footballers
Guatemala international footballers
American soccer players
American people of Guatemalan descent
Association football forwards
FC Cincinnati players
FC Cincinnati 2 players
MLS Next Pro players
Major League Soccer players
Homegrown Players (MLS)